Red Youth Guards is North Korea's youth paramilitary organization. The Red Youth Guard official anniversary is September 12, 1970. It was established under the direction of Kim Il-sung and is acting as a student military organization targeting male and female students aged 14 to 16 at the time.

History
It was founded and established by taking advantage of the internal tensions caused by the Blue House raid and the abduction of the USS Pueblo in 1968. At that time, each social group in North Korea adopted a resolution and delivered it to Kim Il-sung, shouting the slogan, "Let's become a bodyguard and a union in carrying out the orders of the party and Kim Il-sung." Kim Il-sung, who received this resolution, ordered the formation of a student organization, the Red Youth Guard, in the form of accepting the resolutions of each organization in April 1969.

Organization
The Red Youth Guard is organized into a company or battalion level by school unit, and it is known that the total number of members is about 1 million. Each school unit is organized into a company or battalion level, and the total number of students is about 1 million. Students receive 90 hours of on-campus training every Saturday 4 hours a year, and 7 days of red youth guard camp training and emergency call training during summer vacation when they are in middle school. Command and control may have been in the hands of the Central Military Commission of the Workers' Party of Korea in the past, but has since passed to the WPK Civil Defense Department. During wartime, they are placed under the command and control of the Ministry of Defense, and when mobilizing for training, they are transferred to the Socialist Patriotic Youth League and the Education Committee under the Cabinet.

See also
Reserve Military Training Units
Socialist Patriotic Youth League
Worker-Peasant Red Guards
Social Security Forces
Law enforcement in North Korea
Korean People's Army

References

Youth organizations established in 1970
Youth wings of communist parties
Workers' Party of Korea